The Brain Machine is a 1956 British thriller film directed by Ken Hughes and starring Maxwell Reed, Elizabeth Allan and Patrick Barr.

Premise
A husband and wife team of doctors attempt to stop a dangerously unbalanced man from committing a series of crimes.

Production
The film was made at Merton Park Studios in South London by Anglo-Amalgamated. It was released as a co-feature, as part of a double bill.

Cast
 Maxwell Reed as Frank Smith
 Elizabeth Allan as Doctor Phillipa Roberts
 Patrick Barr as Doctor Geoffrey Allen
 Russell Napier as Inspector Durham
 Gibb McLaughlin as Spencer Simon
 Neil Hallett as Detective Superintendent John Harris
 Mark Bellamy as Louie, the gangster
 Bill Nagy as Charlie, gym owner
 Edwin Richfield as Henry Arthur Ryan
 Clifford Buckton as Edward Jarritt
 John Horsley as Doctor Richards
 Gwen Bacon as Nurse-Matron
 Donald Bisset as Major Gifford
 Thomas Gallagher as Bates, plant foreman
 Vanda Godsell as Mabel Smith
 Cyril Smith as Prison Warder
 Anthony Valentine as Tony
 Joan Tyrrell as Woman in Hallway
 Henry Webb as Apartment Janitor
 Dan Wilson as Personnel Manager
 Hilda Barry as Mrs. Wright
 Marianne Stone as Hospital Technician

Reception
Filmink called it " a decent little thriller that feels like it wants to be sci-fi but isn’t."

Berkshire later sued RKO claiming the latter did a poor job distributing.

References

Bibliography
 Chibnall, Steve & McFarlane, Brian. The British 'B' Film. Palgrave MacMillan, 2009.

External links

The Brain Machine at BFI
The Brain Machine at Letterbox DVD
The Brain Machine at Real Streets

British crime thriller films
1950s crime thriller films
1950s English-language films
Films directed by Ken Hughes
1956 films
1950s British films
British black-and-white films